Willy Johnson Semedo Afonso (born 27 April 1994) is a professional footballer who plays as a midfielder for Saudi Arabian club Al-Faisaly. Born in France, Semedo represents the Cape Verde national football team.

Club career

Charleroi
On 31 January 2018, Semedo signed with Charleroi after a successful spell with the Cypriot club Alki Oroklini. He made his debut for the Belgium club in a 2–2 Belgian First Division A draw with K.R.C. Genk, on 13 April 2018.

On 30 August 2018, Semedo was loaned to Belgian First Division B club Roeselare, for half a season, in order for him to get more playing time. On 1 February 2019, he moved to Liga I side Politehnica Iași. Semedo subsequently signed a six month contract with the Romanian club.

On 28 January 2023, Semedo joined Saudi Arabian club Al-Faisaly on an eighteen-month contract.

International career
Born in France, Semedo is of Cape Verdean descent. On 1 October 2020, Semedo was called by Cape Verde. He debuted for Cape Verde in a friendly 2-1 win over Andorra on 7 October 2020.

References

External links
 

1994 births
Living people
People from Montfermeil
Cape Verdean footballers
Cape Verde international footballers
French footballers
French sportspeople of Cape Verdean descent
Association football midfielders
R. Charleroi S.C. players
Alki Oroklini players
K.S.V. Roeselare players
FC Politehnica Iași (2010) players
Grenoble Foot 38 players
Pafos FC players
Al-Faisaly FC players
Belgian Pro League players
Cypriot First Division players
Cypriot Second Division players
Liga I players
Ligue 2 players
Saudi First Division League players
Cape Verdean expatriate footballers
French expatriate footballers
Expatriate footballers in Belgium
Expatriate footballers in Cyprus
Expatriate footballers in Romania
Expatriate footballers in Saudi Arabia
French expatriate sportspeople in Belgium
French expatriate sportspeople in Cyprus
French expatriate sportspeople in Romania
Cape Verdean expatriate sportspeople in Saudi Arabia
French expatriate sportspeople in Saudi Arabia
2021 Africa Cup of Nations players